Danielle Carter-Loblack (born 18 May 1993) is an English footballer who plays as a forward for FA WSL club Brighton & Hove Albion and the England national team.

Club career

Carter came through the ranks at the Leyton Orient Girls Centre of Excellence. In 2009, she moved to Arsenal, while remaining at school in Romford. In the 2010 FA Women's Cup Final, Carter was a 70th-minute substitute for Julie Fleeting, but Arsenal lost 3–2 to Everton after extra time.

In 2011, Carter helped Arsenal win the inaugural FA WSL title, as well as the 2010–11 FA Women's Cup. In the 2011–12 UEFA Women's Champions League, she scored twice against Bobruichanka and once against Rayo Vallecano as Arsenal reached the semi-final, where they lost to 1. FFC Frankfurt. Arsenal retained the WSL in 2012 but were upset by Chelsea in the semi-final of the FA Women's Cup.

In the 2015–16 FA Women's Cup final against Chelsea, she scored in the 18th minute of a 1–0 win which saw Arsenal to victory, thus lifting the cup.

In May 2018, Carter injured her anterior cruciate ligament in league win against Bristol City. Ten months later, against the same team, she made her return from injury in a 4–0 win. Despite this, she was ruled out of the 2019 World Cup. On 28 July 2019, Carter suffered a serious knee injury in a pre-season friendly against Bayern Munich. In August, it was confirmed as an anterior cruciate ligament injury to her right knee, her second in 14 months.

On 15 July 2020, Reading announced the signing of Carter.

Danielle Carter joined Brighton & Hove Albion from Reading for an undisclosed fee in July 2021, signing a two-year contract.

International career
Carter started playing for England at U-15 level. She played as they came fourth in the 2008 FIFA U-17 Women's World Cup in New Zealand, scoring twice against Brazil. Two years later she competed in the 2010 FIFA U-20 Women's World Cup in Germany.

Carter helped Great Britain win a gold medal in July 2013, at the 2013 Summer Universiade in Kazan, Russia. In September 2013, Carter was named in the senior England squad by interim coach Brent Hills.

Coach Mark Sampson gave Carter her senior international debut in a UEFA Women's Euro 2017 qualifying match against Estonia on 21 September 2015. She marked the occasion by scoring a hat-trick in England's 8–0 win.

International goals
As of match played 28 November 2017. England score listed first, score column indicates score after each Carter goal.

Honours
Arsenal
FA Cup: 2016

References

External links

Danielle Carter at UEFA.com
Danielle Carter at The Football Association

1993 births
Living people
Women's association football forwards
English women's footballers
Women's Super League players
Arsenal W.F.C. players
FA Women's National League players
England women's under-23 international footballers
England women's international footballers
Universiade gold medalists for Great Britain
Universiade medalists in football
Medalists at the 2013 Summer Universiade